Put-in-Bay Airport  is a public airport located in Put-in-Bay on South Bass Island in Ottawa County, Ohio, United States.  The approach to Runway 21 is complicated by Perry's Victory and International Peace Memorial, which is almost exactly in line with the runway. The airport is located in the center of the southern half of the island.

Put-in-Bay's airport is open year-round for arrivals and departures from dawn to dusk. Runways at the Put-in-Bay airport are modern and paved but not lighted so there are no departures after dusk. You may expect light turbulence on approach when winds exceed 10 knots. Be sure to remain at least 1000 feet from Perry's monument located 1.5 miles northeast of the field and having an elevation of 942 feet MSL.

There is no fuel service at the Put-in-Bay airport but fuel may be purchased at Erie–Ottawa International Airport  in Port Clinton. The Put-in-Bay airport provides charter services, refreshments (vending) and rest rooms. Credit cards are accepted.

Airport Communications 
CTAF/UNICOM: 122.8
WX AWOS-3 at PCW (7 nm S): 118.775 (419-734-9955)

Instrument Procedures 
There are no published instrument procedures at 3W2.

External links 

Airports in Ohio
Transportation in Ottawa County, Ohio
Buildings and structures in Ottawa County, Ohio